In 1930, Bibo and Lang of New York published the first Disney-licensed publication, Mickey Mouse Book, which featured the story of how he met Walt Disney and got his name. Though it sold very well in book stores, the book was also distributed to movie theaters that hosted Mickey Mouse fan clubs as a gift for the members.

The Book was soon followed a year later by a second book, the first one printed in hardback The Adventures of Mickey Mouse Book I, published by the David McKay Company, an illustrated storybook that presented stories with Mickey, Minnie and a variety of obscure characters from the original cartoon assemble (among them, Horace Horsecollar and Clarabelle Cow) and mentioned and featured a character bearing the name "Donald Duck", just three years before the official Donald first appeared in the Silly Symphony cartoon The Wise Little Hen (1934).

The novelization of Lady and the Tramp written by Ward Greene was incidentally published in 1953, two years before the film's release.

Since then, the Disney characters, films and television programs had have been adapted and subjected to various book formats; novels, storybooks, picture books, board books, booklets and even read-along book and records, tapes and CDs.

The following is a list of books based on Walt Disney Company media, from the classic cartoons and characters such as Mickey Mouse and Donald Duck, the Disney anthology television series, Disney Channel Original Movies, spin-offs from the DCOMs such as the High School Musical film series, Stories from East High or Camp Rock: Second Session, Disney Channel Original Series, and films from Walt Disney Pictures and it's respective franchises (Winnie the Pooh, Herbie, Tron, The Mighty Ducks, Pirates of the Caribbean, etc.).

Disney Channel original movies

Camp Rock

Movie novelizations

Second Session novelizations

Specials

High School Musical

Movie novelizations

Stories From East High novelizations

Specials

Princess Protection Program

Movie novelizations

Princess Protection Program series

Disney Channel Original Series
The following is a list of series of books based on the Disney Channel Original Series such as Hannah Montana and Wizards of Waverly Place.

Cory in the House

Series Novelizations

Hannah Montana

Movie novelizations

Series novelizations

On Tour novelizations

Specials

J.O.N.A.S.

Series novelizations

Kim Possible

Lizzie McGuire

List of Lizzie McGuire books

Phil of the Future

Series novelizations

Phineas and Ferb

Series novelizations

Graphic novels

Sonny with a Chance

Series novelizations

So Weird

Series novelizations

The Suite Life of Zack & Cody

Series novelizations

Wizards of Waverly Place

Movie novelizations

Series novelizations

Other novelizations

Disney Read-Along

Disney Television Animation

Doug: The Funnie Mysteries

Donald Duck universe

Mickey Mouse universe

Storybooks

Wee Little Books

Mickey Mouse Adventures

Walt Disney Pictures
This is a partial list of novelizations based on Disney theatrical feature films, both live-action and animated. As a continuity reference, most of the novels will carry the term on their respective front cover "The Book of the Film".

Film novelizations (in chronological order of theatrical release)
 Walt Disney Tells the Story of Pinocchio (1939), Walt Disney
 Treasure Island (1950)
 The Story of Robin Hood (1952), Edward Boyd 
 Peter Pan (1953)
 Lady and the Tramp (1953), Ward Greene
 Rob Roy: The Highland Rogue (1954), Edward Boyd
 The Great Locomotive Chase (1956), MacLennan Roberts
 Darby O'Gill and the Little People (1959), Lawrence Edward Watkin
 Toby Tyler (1960), Dorothea J. Snow
 Kidnapped (1960), Cole Fannin
 The Swiss Family Robinson (1960), Steve Frazee
 The Absent-Minded Professor (1961), George R. Sherman
 Son of Flubber (1963), Roger Fuller
 The Sword in the Stone (1963), Mary Virginia Carey
 The Misadventures of Merlin Jones (1964), Mary Virginia Carey
 Mary Poppins (1964), Mary Virginia Carey
 Lt. Robin Crusoe, U.S.N. (1966), Bill Ford
 Monkeys, Go Home! (1967), Mel Cebulash
 The Gnome-Mobile (1967), Mary Virginia Carey
 The Jungle Book (1967), Mary Virginia Carey
 Charlie, the Lonesome Cougar (1968), Mark Van Cleefe
 The Happiest Millionaire (1968), A. J. Carothers
 Blackbeard's Ghost (1968), Mary Virginia Carey
 The Love Bug (1969), Mel Cebulash
 The Boatniks (1970), Mel Cebulash
 The Million Dollar Duck (1971), Vic Crume
 Bedknobs and Broomsticks (1971)
 The World's Greatest Athlete (1973), Gerald Gardner and Dee Caruso
 Herbie Rides Again (1974), Mel Cebulash
 The Strongest Man in the World (1975), Mel Cebulash
 Gus (1976), Vic Crume
 Escape from the Dark (1976), Rosemary Anne Sisson
 The Shaggy D. A. (1977), Vic Crume
 Herbie Goes to Monte Carlo (1977), Vic Crume
 Return from Witch Mountain (1978), Alexander Key
 The Black Hole (1979), Alan Dean Foster
 The Last Flight of Noah's Ark (1980), Chas Carner
 Dragonslayer (1981), Wayland Drew
 Condorman (1981), Joe Claro
 Tron (1982), Brian Daley
 Return to Oz (1985), Joan D. Vinge
 The Journey of Natty Gann (1985), Ann Matthews
 One Magic Christmas (1985), Martin Noble
 Return to Snowy River (1988), Tony Johnston
 Honey, I Shrunk the Kids (1989), Bonnie Bryant Hiller and Neil W. Hiller
 Shipwrecked (1991), Bonnie Bryant Hiller
 The Rocketeer (1991), Peter David
 Beauty and the Beast (1991) A. L. Singer
 Newsies (1992), Jonathan Fast
 Honey, I Blew Up the Kid (1992), Bonnie Bryant Hiller
 The Mighty Ducks (1992), Jordan Horowitz
 Aladdin (1992), A. L. Singer
 Hocus Pocus (1993), Todd Strasser
 D2: The Mighty Ducks (1994), Jordan Horowitz
 White Fang 2: Myth of the White Wolf (1994), Elizabeth Faucher 
 The Lion King (1994), Gina Ingoglia
 Angels in the Outfield (1994), Jordan Horowitz
 Squanto: A Warrior's Tale (1994), Ron Fontes and Justine Korman 
 The Santa Clause (1994), Daphne Skinner
 Rudyard Kipling's The Jungle Book (1994), Mel Gilden
 Heavyweights (1995), Jordan Horowitz
 Tall Tale (1995), Todd Strasser
 A Goofy Movie (1995), Francine Hughes
 Pocahontas (1995), Gina Ingoglia
 A Kid in King Arthur's Court (1995), Anne Mazer
 The Big Green (1995), J. J. Gardner
 Toy Story (1995), Cathy East Dubowski
 Homeward Bound II: Lost in San Francisco (1996), Nancy E. Krulik
 The Hunchback of Notre Dame (1996)
 D3: The Mighty Ducks (1996), Jonathan Schmidt
 Jungle 2 Jungle (1997), Nancy E. Krulik
 Hercules (1997), Cathy East Dubowski
 George of the Jungle (1997), Beth Nadler
 Flubber (1997), Cathy East Dubowski
 Mr. Magoo (1997), Nancy E. Krulik
 Mulan (1998), Cathy East Dubowski
 The Parent Trap (1998), Hallie Marshall
 A Bug's Life (1998), Justine Korman and Ron Fontes 
 Mighty Joe Young (1998), Hallie Marshall
 My Favorite Martian (1999), Dona Smith
 Tarzan (1999), Kathleen Weidner Zoehfeld
 Inspector Gadget (1999), Scott Sorrentino
 Toy Story 2 (1999), Leslie Goldman
 The Tigger Movie: The Onliest Tigger (2000), Leslie Goldman
 102 Dalmatians (2000), Nicola J. Holmes
 Treasure Planet (2002)
 Brother Bear (2003)
 Pirates of the Caribbean: The Curse of the Black Pearl (2003)
 Chicken Little (2005)
 The Shaggy Dog (2006)
 Pirates of the Caribbean: Dead Man's Chest (2006), Irene Trimble
 Meet the Robinsons (2007)
 Pirates of the Caribbean: At World's End (2007)
 Bolt (2008)
 Toy Story 3 (2010)
 Tangled (2010)
 Prom (2011), Ellie O'Ryan
 Pirates of the Caribbean: On Stranger Tides (2011)
 Frozen (2013)
 Toy Story 4 (2019)

1960s

1970s

1980s

1990s

Storybooks

Walt Disney's American Classics

Snow White and the Seven Dwarfs

Snow White and the Seven Dwarfs Little Library

Sleeping Beauty

Sleeping Beauty Little Library

Tron

Walt Disney Playmates

Walt Disney's Classics

The Little Mermaid

The Little Mermaid Little Library (Series 1)

The Little Mermaid Little Library (Series 2)

The Little Mermaid's Treasure Chest

The Prince and the Pauper

The Prince and the Pauper Little Library

Beauty and the Beast

Beauty and the Beast Little Library

Aladdin

Aladdin: Six New Adventures

The Further Adventures of Aladdin

Aladdin Little Library

The Lion King

The Lion King: Six New Adventures

Pocahontas

Pocahontas: Six New Adventures

Pocahontas Little Library

The Hunchback of Notre Dame

The Hunchback of Notre Dame: Six New Adventures

The Hunchback of Notre Dame Little Library

Re-Tellings

Pirates of the Caribbean

Jack Sparrow

Legends of the Brethren Court

Other

Aly & AJ Rock & Roll Mysteries

Annual publications

Big Little Books

Disney Chapters

Doug Chronicles

Disney Fairies

Fairy Dust trilogy

Tales of Pixie Hollow

Disney First Readers

Level 1

Level 2

Level 3

Disney Princess

Hollywood Pictures film novelizations

Little Golden Books

Touchstone Pictures film novelizations

Walt Disney Little Library

Series 1

Series 2

Walt Disney Presents: Annette

Walt Disney's Animal Adventures

Whitman Tell-A-Tale Books

The Wonderful World of Disney

The Wuzzles

Collector Series

Winnie the Pooh

Out & About With Pooh - A Grow and Learn Library

See also
Disney Publishing Worldwide

References

External links
 Disney Books

Disney books
Disney Novelizations
Novelizations
Novels based on films
Novels based on television series